The Rennell parrot (Geoffroyus hyacinthinus) is an island species of parrot, found on Rennell Island in the Solomons. It is normally considered a subspecies of the song parrot (Geoffroyus heteroclitus) but differs from it in its larger size, its blue collar being more lavender in colour and extending to the breast, and a more strongly grey-blue tone to the female's head. Population size is estimated at 5,000–20,000 individuals. Although only present in a small range, it is not currently considered threatened.

References

Rennell parrot
Birds of Rennell Island
Rennell parrot